Sergi Bruguera was the defending champion, but finished runner-up this year.

Carlos Costa won the tournament, beating Bruguera in the final, 4–6, 6–2, 6–2.

Seeds

Draw

Finals

Top half

Bottom half

References

 Main Draw

Portugal Open
1992 ATP Tour
Estoril Open